Goodbye, Mickey Mouse is a historical novel by Len Deighton published on 12 October 1982. Set in Britain in early 1944 it tells the story of the 220th Fighter Group of the US Eighth Air Force in the lead up to the Allied invasion of Europe. The Group is based at a fictional airfield in Norfolk named Steeple Thaxted.

Synopsis
Each chapter is titled by the name of the main character it deals with. The central storyline revolves around a love affair between a new pilot, Captain James Farebrother, and an English girl, Victoria Cooper. Another major plot line follows Lieutenant Mickey Morse, nicknamed Mickey Mouse, who is racing to be the first American pilot to break Eddie Rickenbacker's record of 26 kills from World War I.

Critical reception

The New York Times review suggested that the novel successfully evoked wartime Britain, and featured Deighton's trademark technical and operational details of the P-51 Mustang fighter which the Group flies. It described the aerial scenes as few and brief but powerfully capturing the terror and excitement of bomber escort missions over Germany.

Simon Mcleish gave the book a mixed review. He stated that Goodbye Mickey Mouse is obviously "well researched," but the research "is presented less obtrusively". Mcleish also stating that "for the general reader, Goodbye Mickey Mouse" is not Deighton's most appealing novel, "though it would repay the effort required to read it."

References

1982 British novels
Novels set during World War II
Novels by Len Deighton
Novels set in Norfolk
Fiction set in 1944
Aviation novels
Hutchinson (publisher) books
Alfred A. Knopf books